Southern Cross is a ghost town in Deer Lodge County, Montana, United States, at an elevation of 7,000 feet, overlooking Georgetown Lake. Its population was 4 or 5 people as of 2008.

References 

 
 
 

Ghost towns in Montana
Populated places in Deer Lodge County, Montana